Paul Grafer (born August 7, 1974) is a retired American soccer goalkeeper who spent six seasons in Major League Soccer with the Colorado Rapids and MetroStars.  He was the goalkeeper coach for the United States U-17 men's national soccer team between 2007 and 2012. He has been a FIFA Instructor and assistant coach with Chivas USA of Major League Soccer.  He has also been professionally affiliated with Athletes Helping Athletes and SAFE, organizations that provide lifeskills development and training to student athletes. Paul's current professional role is Technical Director for Major League Soccer.

Youth
Grafer graduated from St. Mary's High School in 1992 where he was a Parade All-American.  He then attended The College of William & Mary where he played soccer from 1993 to 1995.  He was an All-American his senior year and gained his degree in kinesiology in 1997.  In 2007, William and Mary inducted Grafer into the school's Athletic Hall of Fame.

Professional
In February 1996, the Colorado Rapids selected Grafer in the 2nd round (19th overall) of the 1996 MLS College Draft.  The Rapids sent him on loan to the Long Island Rough Riders of the USISL for the 1996 season.  In 1997, made Rapids first team, playing thirteen games, gaining only one win, in 1997 and 1998.  On September 30, 1998, he broke his left wrist in practice.  The Rapids waived him on October 30, 1998.  He signed with the Charleston Battery on January 28, 1999, but suffered a major neck injury during the pre-season and lost the entire year.  Instead, he spent the entire year coaching with the Williamsburg Soccer Club.  In 2000, he signed with the Long Island Rough Riders, having an excellent season.  That resulted in him being called up to the MetroStars in 2000 after starter Mike Ammann was injured and backup Tim Howard was playing in the Olympics.  In one of the odder moments in MLS history, the league held a draft consisting of only one player, Paul Grafer, after he signed late with the league.  The San Jose Earthquakes selected Grafer, then traded him back to the MetroStars for Ramiro Corrales on February 23, 2001.  He retired following the 2003 season.  In 2005, he returned with the RoughRiders. He played nineteen games and was named second team All League.

MetroStars folklore
Throughout his career with the MetroStars, he became known for his long, black pants, leading to the chant, "They’re long, they’re black, they’re halfway up his crack – they're Grafer's pants – they're Grafer's pants!"

Post playing career
He earned an MBA and taught at Adelphi University while working as a Program Coordinator for Athletes Helping Athletes, a New York-based non-profit that uses the power and appeal of sport to address social issues.  In 2007, he became the goalkeeper coach for the U.S. U-17 national team. He left USSF in 2012 and became a FIFA Instructor for their Goalkeeping Programme, while helping develop SAFE LLC., a financial literacy and career development company for college student-athletes.  In 2014, he joined Chivas USA of Major League Soccer as an assistant coach. In 2015, he joined MLS' League Office in the Competition Department.

References

External links
 MetroStars Player Profile
 MLS Stats

1974 births
Living people
American soccer coaches
American soccer players
William & Mary Tribe men's soccer players
Colorado Rapids players
Association football goalkeepers
Long Island Rough Riders players
New York Red Bulls players
USL Second Division players
USISL Select League players
Major League Soccer players
A-League (1995–2004) players
Colorado Rapids draft picks
Soccer players from New York (state)
Charleston Battery players
Chivas USA non-playing staff
People from Port Washington, New York
Sportspeople from Nassau County, New York